American producer and rapper Swizz Beatz has released two studio albums, one compilation album, one mixtape, thirty-nine singles (including thirty-one as a featured artist), three promotional singles and thirty-three music videos.

Studio albums

Compilation albums

Mixtapes

Singles

As lead artist

As featured artist

Promotional singles

Other charted songs

Guest appearances

See also
 Swizz Beatz production discography

References

Hip hop discographies
 
 
 
 
Discographies of American artists